The 1980 Society of West End Theatre Awards were held in 1980 in London celebrating excellence in West End theatre by the Society of West End Theatre. The awards would not become the Laurence Olivier Awards, as they are known today, until the 1984 ceremony.

Winners and nominees
Details of winners (in bold) and nominees, in each award category, per the Society of London Theatre.

Productions with multiple nominations and awards
The following 21 productions, including two operas, received multiple nominations:

 7: Nicholas Nickleby
 4: Amadeus
 3: Juno and the Paycock, Life of Galileo, Pal Joey, Sweeney Todd and They're Playing Our Song
 2: A Lesson from Aloes, Born in the Gardens, Così fan tutte, Duet for One, Educating Rita, Harlequinade, Jeeves Takes Charge, Make and Break, Oklahoma, On the Twentieth Century, The Browning Version, The Dresser, The Greeks and The Turn of the Screw

The following two productions received multiple awards:

 6: Nicholas Nickleby
 2: Sweeney Todd

See also
 34th Tony Awards

References

External links
 Previous Olivier Winners – 1980

Laurence Olivier Awards ceremonies
Laurence Olivier Awards, 1980
Laurence Olivier Awards
Laurence Olivier Awards